Scott Sander Sheppard (born 1977) is an American astronomer and a discoverer of numerous moons, comets and minor planets in the outer Solar System.

He is an astronomer in the Department of Terrestrial Magnetism at the Carnegie Institution for Science in Washington, DC. He attended Oberlin College as an undergraduate, and received his bachelor in physics with honors in 1998. Starting as a graduate student at the Institute for Astronomy at the University of Hawaii, he was credited with the discovery of many small moons of Jupiter, Saturn, Uranus, and Neptune. He has also discovered the first known trailing Neptune trojan, the first named leading Neptune trojan, 385571 Otrera, and the first high inclination Neptune trojan, . These discoveries showed that the Neptune trojan objects are mostly on highly inclined orbits and thus likely captured small bodies from elsewhere in the Solar System.

The main-belt asteroid 17898 Scottsheppard, discovered by LONEOS at Anderson Mesa Station in 1999, was named in his honor.

Discoveries 

Sheppard was the lead discoverer of the object with the most distant orbit known in the Solar System,  (nicknamed Biden). In 2018, the announcement of the high perihelion inner Oort cloud object 541132 Leleākūhonua (nicknamed "The Goblin") by Sheppard et al., being only the third known after  and Sedna, further demonstrated that a super-Earth planet in the distant solar system likely exists as Leleākūhonua has many orbital similarities as the two other known inner Oort cloud objects.

Most notable discoveries 

Sheppard has been involved in the discovery of many small Solar System bodies such as trans-Neptunian objects, centaurs, comets and near-Earth objects.
 Three comets are named after him which are Sheppard-Trujillo (C/2014 F3), Sheppard-Tholen (C/2015 T5) and comet Trujillo-Sheppard (P/2018 V5).
 In 2018, Sheppard was the lead discoverer of the most distant observed object in our solar system and first object observed beyond 100 AU, dwarf planet  (nicknamed Farout), which is around 120 AU from the Sun.
 He discovered a minor-planet moon around likely dwarf planet .
 He is also a co-discoverer of a minor-planet moon orbiting the binary trans-Neptunian object 341520 Mors–Somnus.
 Among the numerous irregular moons of the major planets in whose discovery he has been involved are:

Jupiter
Discovered moons of Jupiter (full list):

 Themisto (2000), first seen but lost in 1975 by Charles Kowal
 Harpalyke (2000)
 Praxidike (2000)
 Chaldene (2000)
 Isonoe (2000)
 Erinome (2000)
 Taygete (2000)
 Kalyke (2000)
 Megaclite (2000)
 Iocaste (2000)
 Dia (2000)
 Euporie (2001)
 Orthosie (2001)
 Euanthe (2001)
 Thyone (2001)
 Hermippe (2001)
 Pasithee (2001)
 Aitne (2001)
 Eurydome (2001)
 Autonoe (2001)
 Sponde (2001)
 Kale (2001)
 Arche (2002)
 Eukelade (2003)
 Helike (2003)
 Aoede (2003)
 Hegemone (2003)
 Kallichore (2003)
 Cyllene (2003)
 Mneme (2003)
 Thelxinoe (2003)
 Carpo (2003)
 Kore (2003)
 Herse (2003)
 S/2003 J 2 (2003)
 Eupheme (2003)
 S/2003 J 4 (2003)
 Eirene (2003)
 S/2003 J 9 (2003)
 S/2003 J 10 (2003)
 S/2003 J 12 (2003)
 Philophrosyne (2003)
 S/2003 J 16 (2003)
 Jupiter LV (2003)
 Jupiter LXI (2003)
 S/2003 J 23 (2003)
 S/2003 J 24 (2003)
 Jupiter LXXII (2011)
 Jupiter LVI (2011)
 S/2011 J 3 (2011)
 Jupiter LIV (2016)
 Valetudo (2016)
 S/2016 J 3 (2016)
 S/2016 J 4 (2016)
 Jupiter LIX (2017)
 Jupiter LXIII (2017)
 Jupiter LXIV (2017)
 Pandia (2017)
 Jupiter LXVI (2017)
 Jupiter LXVII (2017)
 Jupiter LXVIII (2017)
 Jupiter LXIX (2017)
 Jupiter LXX (2017)
 Ersa (2018)
 S/2018 J 2 (2018)
 S/2018 J 3 (2018)
 S/2018 J 4 (2018)
 S/2021 J 1 (2021)
 S/2021 J 2 (2021)
 S/2021 J 3 (2021)
 S/2021 J 4 (2021)
 S/2021 J 5 (2021)
 S/2021 J 6 (2021)
 S/2022 J 1 (2022)
 S/2022 J 2 (2022)
 S/2022 J 3 (2022)

Saturn
Discovered moons of Saturn (full list):

 Narvi (2003)
 Fornjot (2004)
 Farbauti (2004)
 Aegir (2004)
 Bebhionn (2004)
 Hati (2004)
 Bergelmir (2004)
 Fenrir (2004)
 Bestla (2004)
 Kari (2004)
 S/2004 S 7 (2004)
 S/2004 S 12 (2004)
 S/2004 S 13 (2004)
 S/2004 S 17 (2004)
 Hyrrokkin (2006)
 Loge (2006)
 Surtur (2006)
 Skoll (2006)
 Greip (2006)
 Jarnsaxa (2006)
 S/2006 S 1 (2006)
 S/2006 S 3 (2006)
 Tarqeq (2007)
 S/2007 S 2 (2007)
 S/2007 S 3 (2007)
 Gridr (2019)
 S/2004 S 21 (2019)
 Angrboda (2019)
 Skrymir (2019)
 S/2004 S 24 (2019)
 Gerd (2019)
 Saturn LVIII (2019)
 Eggther (2019)
 S/2004 S 28 (2019)
 Saturn LX (2019)
 Beli (2019)
 S/2004 S 31 (2019)
 Gunnlod (2019)
 Thiazzi (2019)
 Saturn LXIV (2019)
 Alvaldi (2019)
 S/2004 S 36 (2019)
 S/2004 S 37 (2019)
 Geirrod (2019)
 S/2004 S 39 (2019)

 Uranus
Discovered moons of Uranus (full list):
 Margaret (2003)
 Ferdinand (2003), first seen but lost in 2001 by Holman et al.

 Neptune
Discovered moons of Neptune (full list):
 Psamathe (2003)

See also

References

External links 
 Scott Sheppard's web site, Carnegie Institution for Science
 Scott S. Sheppard – Curriculum Vitae, Carnegie Institution for Science

1977 births
American astronomers
Planetary scientists

Discoverers of moons
Discoverers of trans-Neptunian objects
Living people